Dzmitry Rabtsaw (born 16 August 1991) is a Belarusian professional football coach and former player.

External links

1991 births
Living people
Belarusian footballers
Association football midfielders
FC Gomel players
FC Rechitsa-2014 players
FC DSK Gomel players
FC Polotsk players
Belarusian football managers